The Miss Chinatown USA pageant, based on Chinese communities within the U.S., greets delegates around the country. The pageant has been an annual Lunar New Year event since 1958. The winners of this pageant represent the Chinese community and act as ambassadors promoting Chinese culture and heritage.

History
A local beauty pageant had been held by the Chinese American Citizens Alliance (CACA) and the San Francisco Lodge around Independence Day since 1948, with Penny (Lee) Wong as the first winner (CACA). The 1948 pageant was held in Pleasanton. Other winners included Lotus Wong (1948, Chinese Consolidated Benevolent Association or CCBA), Fanny Don (1949, CACA), Lena Jane Chin (1950), Dorothy Lee (1951), and Annie Chow (1952).

Following the conclusion of the Chinese Civil War in 1949, the first official Lunar New Year Parade in San Francisco's Chinatown was held in 1953 to project that community as "patriotic, assimilated [and] compatible with American values". That year Pat Kan, the daughter of noted Chinatown restaurateur Johnny Kan, was chosen as "Miss Firecracker" by non-Chinese reporters and posed with "nothing but a string of firecrackers". In 1954, the local beauty pageant was rolled into the parade as a contest to select the Festival Queen and the parade expanded into a multi-day event. Chinese New Year Parade / Festival Queens included Bernice Woong (1954), Carolyn Lim (1955), Estelle Dong (1956), and Ruby Kwong (1957).

In 1958, the pageant was opened to seventeen competitors from around the United States and the first winner was June Gong, a 21-year old originally from Miami who previously had won the 1957 Miss New York Chinatown pageant and was runner-up for the 1957 Miss New Hampshire title. Gong was a senior majoring in Home Economics at the University of New Hampshire. Judges at the 1958 contest included Chin Yang Lee, Joseph Fields, Richard Pollard, Mrs. K. L. Kwong, Mrs. John Yu, and Sally Lee Thompson; the judges since then have been a mix of prominent citizens, both Asian and non-Asian. 

Kem K. Lee was the first official photographer of the pageant and photographed the event until his death in 1986; he also covered the earlier pageants dating back to 1948. In 1961, the Sahara Hotel in Las Vegas announced plans to hold its own "Miss Chinatown USA" pageant, but changed the name of its contest to "Miss East Bay" after a protest from the San Francisco Chinese Chamber of Commerce (SFCCC). That year, contestants included representatives from Durham, North Carolina, Fresno, California, Los Angeles, Minneapolis, Minnesota, New York City, Phoenix, Arizona, Seattle, Washington, D.C. and Whittier, California.

Criticism

The signature evening gown is a tightly fitted cheongsam, chosen by the New Year Festival's organizer, H.K. Wong, to exoticize the contestants as "the perfect blend of East and West" and draw tourists to Chinatown. Although the earlier (1948–53) local beauty pageant featured western dresses, author Chiou-Ling Yeh asserts the new pageant served to reinforce stereotypes: the choice of the cheongsam reinforced sexualized perception of Chinese women through its extra high-cut side slit, and early publicity emphasized the value of traditional, patriarchal ideals for female behavior, referring to the Three Obediences and Four Virtues.  The winners were seen as cultural ambassadors to bridge the gap between Chinese-American immigrants and western society; in one instance, a restriction on the use of firecrackers in San Francisco was lifted after San Francisco Mayor George Christopher kissed the reigning Miss Chinatown in 1956.

Additional criticisms of the pageant, including it being not truly representative of the Chinatown population, reinforcing Caucasian beauty standards, and perpetuating the model minority stereotype have arisen since its origins. The Holiday Inn Chinatown sponsored one of the 1971 contestants; as a publicity stunt, she jumped out of a giant fortune cookie for the opening of the hotel, later drawing jeers and eggs when she rode on a float during the Lunar New Year parade.

Performance artist Kristina Wong has crashed numerous events in costume as the character "Fannie Wong, former Miss Chinatown 2nd runner up" since 2002; parodying the stereotype of a quiet, demure Asian woman, Wong describes Fannie as a "cigar chomping, leg humping fast talking beauty queen" that was "often escorted out of venues". Wong grew up in San Francisco idolizing Miss Chinatown, but admits she was "nervous because she did not know how she'd transition from being 'completely sexually repressed and totally awkward' to someone who was beautiful and self-assured. 'I felt like such an embarrassment to my family.

Pageant rules

Eligibility is limited to unmarried United States citizens of Chinese descent between the ages of 17 and 26, which means the entrant's father must be of Chinese descent. Local Chinatown beauty contests were won by the contestant that raised the most funds or sold the most raffle tickets for their family association, but these rules were changed. Initially, contestants were required to answer questions posed in Chinese, but by 1965, it was recognized that some, especially those who had not grown up in Chinatown, did not possess the necessary bilingual skills and the committee stopped factoring the Chinese language responses into the results. , the four scored segments are introduction, talent, swimsuit, and question-and-answer.

The winner of the Miss Chinatown USA title receives a  scholarship and, during her reigning year, travels to meet with family associations, officials, and politicians in the United States and abroad as a goodwill ambassador. As a national pageant, the titleholder of Miss Chinatown USA also is eligible to enter the Miss Chinese International Pageant, a contest for women of Chinese descent not residing in China. For instance, Ni Jiang won Miss Chinatown USA in 2008, then competed in Miss Chinese International in early 2009.

The first runner-up for Miss Chinatown USA holds the simultaneous titles of First Princess and Miss Chinese Chamber of Commerce. Third place is named Second Princess. There is a separate award for Miss Talent, given to the contestant who receives the highest talent score.

Venue

The first Miss Chinatown pageant was held on February 15, 1958 at the Great China Theater. The theater, now renamed as the Great Star, was completed in 1925 to stage Chinese operas and is still showing limited engagements and live performances. Since then, pageants have been held at larger event locations in San Francisco, including the SF Masonic Auditorium (starting in 1959),  Palace of Fine Arts Theatre, and Hyatt Regency San Francisco.

Traditionally, a separate coronation ball is staged at a separate venue after the pageant; in 2012, the coronation ball was held at the Hilton San Francisco Union Square. In 2020, the coronation ball was held at the InterContinental San Francisco. For 2022, the pageant and coronation ball occurred on the same night, in the same venue.

List of Miss Chinatown USA titleholders

Progress in Miss Chinese International

References

Sources
 Asian American History and Culture. Routledge.
 Northwest Asian Weekly
East West 
European Glocalization in Global Context. Palgrave Macmillan.

External links

Miss Chinatown USA Pageant (Official Site)
Chinese Pageant Pictures
 
 

USA
Beauty pageants in the United States
1958 establishments in the United States
American awards
Chinese-American culture